Philosophia Christi is a biannual peer-reviewed academic journal published by the Evangelical Philosophical Society with the support of Biola University. It covers philosophical issues in the fields of apologetics, ethics, theology, and religion from an evangelical perspective and publishes articles, philosophical notes, and book reviews. The editor-in-chief is Craig Hazen.

The journal is abstracted and indexed by The Philosopher's Index, Religious and Theological Abstracts, the American Theological Library Association, and Index Theologicus. Online access will be provided by the Philosophy Documentation Center.

References

External links 
 

Protestant studies journals
English-language journals
Biannual journals
Publications established in 1999
Academic journals published by learned and professional societies
Philosophy journals
Christian apologetics
Christian ethics
Philosophy Documentation Center academic journals